Barbora Votíková (born 13 September 1996) is a Czech professional footballer who plays as a goalkeeper for French Division 1 Féminine club Paris Saint-Germain and the Czech Republic national team. Known as Bára, she is also a YouTuber.

Club career
Born in Plasy, Votíková started her youth career with local club TJ Sokol Plasy at 8 years old, where she played with boys. She moved to youth academy of Viktoria Plzeň later. In 2013 at the age of 17, she started to play for club's senior team.

In 2014, Votíková joined Slavia Prague with whom she played in UEFA Women's Champions League for the first time. During 2017–18 season, she helped her club reach the quarter-finals of Champions League.

On 25 August 2021, French club Paris Saint-Germain signed Votíková on a two-year deal.

International career
Votíková is a former Czech youth international. She have appeared for under-19 team at qualification stage of 2014 and 2015 UEFA Women's Under-19 Championship. She made her senior team debut on 28 October 2014, by coming on as a half-time substitute for Radka Bednaříková in a 1–1 draw against Poland.

Outside football
Votíková started her YouTube channel on 12 April 2015. In 2021, Forbes magazine ranked her sixth in most paid youtubers from Czech Republic. She have also appeared in Czech films such as Pepa (2018) and Cena za štěstí (2019). Votíková holds also a fashion company named BARBES with her former girlfriend, poker player Barbora Mlejnková.

Personal life 
In 2019, a book called Bára Votíková: Trochu jinak (English: Bára Votíková: A Little Different) written by herself was published. She came out as lesbian in the book.

Career statistics

International

Honours
Slavia Prague
 Czech Women's First League: 2014–15, 2015–16, 2016–17, 2019–20
 Czech Women's Cup: 2015–16

Paris Saint-Germain
 Coupe de France féminine: 2021–22

References

External links 

 Profile on SK Slavia Prague website
 Interview for the portal eFotbal.cz
 YouTube channel

1996 births
Living people
Sportspeople from Plzeň
Women's association football goalkeepers
Czech women's footballers
Czech YouTubers
Czech Republic women's international footballers
Czech Women's First League players
Division 1 Féminine players
FC Viktoria Plzeň players
SK Slavia Praha (women) players
Paris Saint-Germain Féminine players
Czech expatriate footballers
Czech expatriate sportspeople in France
Expatriate women's footballers in France
Lesbian sportswomen
LGBT association football players
Czech LGBT sportspeople
Czech lesbians
LGBT YouTubers
20th-century Czech LGBT people
21st-century Czech LGBT people